HDMS Den Prægtige (prior to 20 July 1772. HDMS Dronningen) was a ship of the line of the Royal Dano-Norwegian Navy, launched in 1768.

Construction and design
Sronningen was constructed at Nyholm Dockyard to a design by Frederik Michael Krabbe. She was laid down on 15 March 1768, launched on 22 November 1768 and the construction was completed in May 1772.

Her complement was 818 men. Her armament was 80 36-pounder guns.

Career
On 20 July 1772, following Christian VII's divorce from Queen Caroline Matilda, Dronnibngen was renamed Den Prægtige.

In 1794, she was under the command of Johan Peter Wleugel.

She was decommissioned in 1799.

References

Rxternal links

Ships of the line of the Royal Dano-Norwegian Navy
Ships designed by Frederik Michael Krabbe
Ships built in Copenhagen
1768 ships